Hixson High School is a public high school in the Hamilton County Schools system located in the Chattanooga, Tennessee, suburb of Hixson, with grades 9-12.

History

Hixson High School was founded in 1909.  Its current site opened in 1966.  It has been accredited by the Southern Association of Colleges and Schools since 1959.  Hixson High had grades 10-12 until the fall of 1993 when it welcomed its first freshman class.

School honors

In 1984, Hixson High was awarded the Carnegie Award for School Excellence and was recognized as one of the top six high schools in Tennessee.  In 1984 and 1985, the U.S. Department of Education recognized Hixson as a National School of Excellence.

Campus

Overcrowding at the former site of Hixson High resulted in plans being made, beginning in 1964, for a new school facility.  The new (current) school building, two miles from the old school site, was dedicated in 1966.  A two-story wing to the school for the mathematics, music, and foreign language departments was added in 1986.  Ground was broken in 1992 for another addition which includes classrooms, chemistry labs, home ec labs, a student publication room, teacher work areas, locker space, and an expanded music department.  In 1977, Hixson Community Stadium was dedicated at the new school, the result of a community effort to move the football team's home games from the former school location.

Athletic facilities

Hixson's football team plays at Hixson Community Stadium/Anthony Martino Field and has a separate practice field.  The stadium has a six-lane all-weather track. Hixson's baseball facility is John Plumlee Stadium.  The soccer teams play at Bob Martin Field.  A new softball stadium opened in 2006.  The soccer and softball facilities share a concessions/restrooms building that opened in 2011.  The tennis teams train and play home matches at a new on-campus facility built in 2019. Hixson High is within walking distance of two 18-hole golf courses. The bowling teams use Hixson's Holiday Bowl lanes for home competitions.  Hixson's gymnasium, the school's oldest athletic facility (original to the building opened in 1966), is home to the basketball, wrestling, and volleyball teams.  Hixson also has a wrestling practice room.  All Hixson athletes have access to the Bullocks Strength Complex, which opened in 2007.

Athletics

Hixson competes in the Tennessee Secondary School Athletic Association (TSSAA) and fields varsity teams in all TSSAA-sanctioned sports.  Hixson has won team state championships in wrestling (1973, 2009, 2010, 2014), softball (1983, 1984, 1987, 1988), boys soccer (1988), boys (2004) and girls (1985) golf, and boys (2007) and girls (2006) bowling.

Notable alumni
Daniel Bullocks '01, professional football player
Josh Bullocks '01, professional football player
Kim Criswell, singer, actress
Michael Houser, lead guitarist, Widespread Panic
Guy A. Lewis, attorney
Kelley Lovelace, songwriter
Scott Ourth '77, Iowa state representative
Danny Shirley, '74, lead singer, Confederate Railroad
Robin Tucker Smith '81, Tennessee state representative
Don Stephenson, '82, actor, director
Kim Hudson White, '78, President/CEO, River City Company
Wayne White, '75, artist

References

External links
Official web site

Public high schools in Tennessee
Chattanooga, Tennessee
Schools in Hamilton County, Tennessee
Educational institutions established in 1909
1909 establishments in Tennessee